The 1993–94 Turkish Ice Hockey Super League season was the second season of the Turkish Ice Hockey Super League, the top level of ice hockey in Turkey. Six teams participated in the league.

Standings

External links
 Season on hockeyarchives.info

TBHSL
Turkish Ice Hockey Super League seasons
TBSHL